Join the Dots is the second studio album by British psychedelic rock band TOY, released on 9 December 2013 in Europe and the UK (17 December, USA) through Heavenly Recordings. The band recorded the album with Dan Carey, who also produced their debut album, and it took twice as long as their first album to record and master. The first single to be released from the album was "Join the Dots", released in October, 2013, as a download and limited hand-stamped seven-inch vinyl. A limited edition of the album included the EP Join the Dubs containing five Dub remixes.

Reception

Join the Dots received positive reviews from critics. On Metacritic, the album holds a score of 72/100 based on 17 reviews, indicating "generally favorable reviews."

Track listing 
"Conductor" - 7:08
"You Won't Be the Same" - 4:41
"As We Turn" - 4:09
"Join the Dots" - 7:57
"To a Death Unknown" - 5:02
"Endlessly" - 4:32
"It's Been So Long" - 4:03
"Left to Wander" - 4:08
"Too Far Gone to Know" - 5:07
"Frozen Atmosphere" - 4:05
"Fall Out of Love" - 9:51
[JAPANESE BONUS TRACKS]
"Not On Your Own"
"Sequence"

Personnel
 Maxim Barron – bass, vocals
 Tom Dougall – guitar, vocals
 Dominic O'Dair – guitar
 Alejandra Diez – synthesizer
 Charlie Salvidge – drums, vocals
 Dan Carey – mixing, production
 Alexis Smith - engineering

References 

2013 albums
Toy (English band) albums
Heavenly Recordings albums
Albums produced by Dan Carey (record producer)